Chee Dale Halt railway station was a timber-built railway halt located on the Peak Forest Junction to Buxton Junction spur of a triangle of the former Midland Railway lines at Blackwell Mill. The halt was opened on 5 July 1987 by British Rail and used for a summer Sundays-only passenger service promoted by Peak Rail that ran between Edale railway station and Chee Dale, and closed on 13 September 1987.

Use
The halt was used primarily by ramblers on the nearby Monsal Trail. There was no road access to the halt.

Closure
The passenger train ran for one summer season, until the Health and Safety executive raised concerns that the signalling along the line was not adequate for passenger trains. British Rail decided that it would not be economically viable to upgrade the signalling for a summer Sundays-only service, and the halt closed on 13 September 1987 after the last train left. The halt remained for a few years after closure, but was removed in the early 1990s to become Peak Rail's Matlock Riverside station. The line is still open for freight services.

References

 Disused Stations: Cheedale Halt

Disused railway stations in Derbyshire
Railway stations opened by British Rail
Railway stations in Great Britain opened in 1987
Railway stations in Great Britain closed in 1987
1987 establishments in England
1987 disestablishments in England